Marie-Paule Charette-Poulin (born June 21, 1945) was a Canadian senator until resigning in April 2015 and was the president of the Liberal Party of Canada from 2006 to 2008. She is married to international portrait artist Bernard Poulin.

Education

Born Marie-Paule Charette in Sudbury, Ontario, on June 21, 1945, she was raised in Sudbury and Haileybury. She was a classmate and friend of MP Diane Marleau in high school; Charette-Poulin and Marleau remained friends throughout their careers.

She was educated at Laurentian University, graduating magna cum laude with a Bachelor of Arts in 1966, and the Université de Montréal, obtaining her Master's of Social Science in 1969. In 1995, Laurentian awarded her an honorary Doctor of Laws.  Charette-Poulin received an LL.B. from the University of Ottawa in 2007.

Professional life
In the earlier part of her career, Charette-Poulin worked as a program producer, researcher and university lecturer. She was then a deputy minister in the government of Canada and a broadcast executive. As Deputy Secretary to the Cabinet at the Privy Council Office, she oversaw all government communications and consultations. As Vice-President of the Canadian Broadcasting Corporation, she held various portfolios: Human Resources and Industrial Relations; Secretary General to the Board; and Regional Radio and Television Broadcasting Operations. Prior to her national experience at the CBC, she was founding Director of the Corporation's Northern Ontario French Services, which included launching the Sudbury radio station CBON and establishing over 30 retransmitter antennae in northern Ontario

Political life
In 1995, following the death of Jean Noël Desmarais, Charette-Poulin was appointed to her Senate seat by Prime Minister Jean Chrétien.  She represented the senate division of Northern Ontario for the Liberal Party of Canada.

Charette-Poulin was a member of the Senate Committee on National Finance and a past member Senate Standing Committee on Agriculture and Forestry, of the Senate Standing Committee on Official Languages, of the Senate Standing Committee on Internal Economy, Budgets and Administration, of the Senate Standing Committee on National Security and Defence and of the Standing Committee on Banking, Trade and Commerce. She chaired the Senate Standing Committee on Transport and Communications and as Chair of the Communications Subcommittee, and led the review on Canada's national and international position in communications and telecommunications. Charette-Poulin was the first woman to chair the Senate Liberal Caucus and the first senator to chair the Northern Ontario Liberal Caucus. From December 2006 to April 2008, she served as President of the Liberal Party of Canada.

Senator Charette-Poulin's professional achievements and participation on the boards of various organizations have earned her national and international recognition over the years, including the "Prix Marcel Blouin" for the best radio morning program in Canada in 1983, the "Médaille du Conseil de la vie française" in 1988, the "Ordre de la Pléaide" in 1995, an honorary Doctor of Law degree from Laurentian University in 1995, the insignia of "Officier de l'Ordre national de la Légion d'Honneur de la France" in 2003, the insignia of the Order of St. John in 2004, "Trille de Platine" in 2008, and "Personnalité Richelieu International 2008."

Charette-Poulin has served on the Bell Globemedia board as well as on several hospital boards, university and college boards, chambers of commerce, arts and culture boards, and United Ways. She was a member of the Implementation Committee for Bill 8 in Ontario and a founding director of La Cité collégiale and the Regroupement des gens d'affaires (RGA). She was the first woman to chair the RGA. She currently sits on the board of Governors of the ACTRA Fraternal Benefit Society and the "CEO of the Year Award." She was the Canadian president of the Fédération Canada-France, and as Vice-Chair of the Canada-Japan Inter-Parliamentary Group, she was a member of the Asia-Pacific Parliamentary Forum.

As a senator, she was a member of the Senate committee on Internal Economy, Budgets and Administration, and the Senate committee on National Security and Defense. As well, she was a past member of the committee on Banking, Trade and Commerce. She chaired the Senate committee on Transport and Communications and the subcommittee on Communications; leading the review of Canada's national and international position in communications and telecommunications.

She was the first woman to chair the Senate Liberal caucus, and the first senator to chair the Northern Ontario Liberal caucus.

Charette-Poulin ran for the presidency of the party at the party's leadership convention in 2006.  She defeated former MP Tony Ianno and party activist Bobbi Ethier to win the election. She was the second woman and first francophone woman to hold this position.

Charette-Poulin suffered a mild stroke in April 2008. Although she was expected to make a full recovery, she said that she would be stepping down immediately as Liberal Party President, saying that she now tires easily and was unable to put in the 40 or 50 hours of week that the party job demanded.

In February 2009, Charette-Poulin was kissed by U.S. President Barack Obama during his visit to Canada. Charette-Poulin said that she was wondering "whether the honour [she] experienced [Thursday] with President Obama really happened." Charette-Poulin was the only Canadian woman that Obama kissed on his first foreign visit. When Charette-Poulin met Obama, she told him that she was the "future mother-in-law of Jean-Michel Picher." Obama replied that "Jean-Michel is one of my favourite people," then kissed her on both cheeks.

On January 29, 2014, Liberal Party leader Justin Trudeau announced all Liberal Senators, including Charette-Poulin, were removed from the Liberal caucus, and would continue sitting as independents. According to Senate Opposition leader James Cowan, the Senators will still refer to themselves as Liberals even if they are no longer members of the parliamentary Liberal caucus.

Charette-Poulin resigned from the Senate on April 17, 2015 for health reasons. In June 2015, she was named as one of nine senators whose expenses were referred to the Royal Canadian Mounted Police for a criminal investigation. In 2016, all nine Senators were exonerated : The Royal Canadian Mounted Police concluded that no further action was required (source needed).

Personal life
Charette-Poulin is married to international portrait artist Bernard A. Poulin. They have two adult daughters, Elaine and Valerie.

See also
 List of Ontario senators

References

External links
 Senator Marie Charette-Poulin

1945 births
Living people
Canadian senators from Ontario
Franco-Ontarian people
Laurentian University alumni
Université de Montréal alumni
Liberal Party of Canada senators
Politicians from Greater Sudbury
People from Temiskaming Shores
Women members of the Senate of Canada
Canadian radio executives
Women in Ontario politics
Presidents of the Liberal Party of Canada
21st-century Canadian politicians
21st-century Canadian women politicians